Critical Reviews in Eukaryotic Gene Expression is a quarterly scientific journal published by Begell House publishing reviews on topics related to gene regulation, organization, and structure within contexts of biological control and diagnosis/treatment of disease.

According to the Journal Citation Reports, its 2018 impact factor is 1.841. The editors-in-chief are Gary S. Stein, Janet L. Stein, and Jane B. Lian.

External links 
 

Publications established in 1990
English-language journals
Genetics journals
Quarterly journals
Begell House academic journals
Review journals